A hot point probe is a method of quickly determining whether a semiconductor sample is n-type or p-type. The sample is probed using a voltmeter or ammeter and a heat source, such as a soldering iron, is placed on one of the leads. The heat will cause charge carriers (electrons in n-type, holes in p-type) to move away from the lead. The heat from the probe creates an increased number of carriers, which then diffuse away from the contact point. This causes a current/voltage difference. 

For example, if the heat source is placed on the positive lead of a voltmeter attached to an n-type semiconductor, a positive voltage reading will result as the area around the heat source/positive lead becomes positively charged. A simple explanation is that the thermally-excited majority free carriers move from the hot probe to the cold probe.  The mechanism for this motion with in semiconductor is diffusion type since the material is uniformly doped.

References

Electronic test equipment